The Estelle & Zoom Fleisher Athletic Center is a 1,600-seat multi-purpose arena in Newark, New Jersey, USA.

Built in 1967, it was the home of the New Jersey Institute of Technology Highlanders men's and women's basketball, volleyball, fencing and swim teams until the Wellness and Events Center opened.

The multi-purpose arena has a main hall area with three basketball/volleyball courts which could be independently partitioned for simultaneous tournament hosting and practice.

Other amenities includes a medical clinic, a 25-yard indoor swimming pool, a fitness center, two weight rooms, sauna, training room, locker rooms, racquetball courts and a two-lane jogging track.

NJIT played its last game at the arena on February 23, 2017, an 88–87 win over USC Upstate in front of a crowd of 677. The team has since moved to the new Wellness and Events Center starting with the 2018-19 season.

See also
 Golden Dome Athletic Center
 List of college athletic programs in New Jersey
 List of NCAA Division I basketball arenas
 History of sports in Newark, New Jersey
 Sports in New Jersey

References

External links
 NJIT Athletic Facilities
 Zoom Fleisher

College basketball venues in the United States
NJIT Highlanders basketball
Sports venues in Newark, New Jersey
Indoor arenas in New Jersey